Sir Robert William Aske, 1st Baronet JP (29 December 1872 – 10 March 1954) was a barrister and Liberal Party politician in the United Kingdom.

Family
Aske was born a son of Edward Aske. In 1899 he married Edith McGregor. She died in 1900. In 1909 he married Edith Cockerline. They had two sons and two daughters. She died in 1918.

Military career
Aske was a part-time soldier, commissioned into a Volunteer battalion of the East Yorkshire Regiment on 9 February 1898 and was promoted to Lt-Colonel and commanding officer of the 5th (Cyclist) Battalion, East Yorkshire Regiment of the Territorial Force (TF) on 20 October 1910. He mobilised the battalion in August 1914 and commanded it on coast defence duties during the early years of World War I. He retired from the battalion and was transferred to the TF Reserve on 24 December 1917; he was awarded the Territorial Decoration on 22 May 1918.

Political career
He first stood for parliament in 1910, contesting Hull Central, a seat that the Conservatives had held in the 1906 Liberal landslide. Though it was not a promising seat, he did very well, coming to within 20 votes of defeating the incumbent. A third opportunity came to contest Hull Central at a by-election. His Conservative opponent had been unseated on petition. However he was again unsuccessful. He was Chairman of the Hull and District Liberal Federation. He did not contest Hull Central again and did not stand for parliament again until 1923. At the 1923 general election he was elected as Member of Parliament (MP) for Newcastle upon Tyne East, but lost his seat a year later, at the 1924 general election, to Labour's Martin Henry Connolly. Aske regained the seat at the 1929 general election, and held it until his retirement at the 1945 general election.  When the Liberal Party split in 1931 over participation in Ramsay MacDonald's Conservative-dominated National Government, Aske was one those who broke away to form the new National Liberal Party, which merged in 1948 with the Conservatives.

He was knighted in 1911. He was created a baronet in the 1922 New Year Honours. He served as a Justice of the peace in Surrey. He served as Deputy Sheriff of Hull on three occasions.

Electoral record

References

Sources

External links
 

1872 births
1954 deaths
Baronets in the Baronetage of the United Kingdom
Knights Bachelor
Liberal Party (UK) MPs for English constituencies
National Liberal Party (UK, 1931) politicians
UK MPs 1923–1924
UK MPs 1929–1931
UK MPs 1931–1935
UK MPs 1935–1945
East Yorkshire Regiment officers
Politicians awarded knighthoods